Lafayette Green Pool (July 23, 1919 – May 30, 1991) was an American tank-crew and tank-platoon commander in World War II and is widely recognized as the US tank ace of aces, credited with 12 confirmed tank kills and 258 total armored vehicle and self-propelled gun kills, over 1,000 German soldiers killed and 250 more taken as prisoners of war, accomplished in only 81 days of action from June 27 to September 19, 1944, using three different Shermans. He received many medals, including the Distinguished Service Cross, the Legion of Merit, the Silver Star, the Purple Heart, the Belgian fourragère, and the French Legion of Honour.

Early life
Lafayette Green Pool was born in Odem, Texas, on July 23, 1919, to John K. (1894–1979) and Mary Lee (née Laycock) Pool (1899–1950) He had a twin brother, John Thomas, (who served in the Navy during World War II) and a sister, Tennie Mae (1915–1994). Lafayette attended high school in Taft, Texas, graduating in 1938; he later attended Texas College of Arts and Industries in Kingsville, Texas, studying engineering and participating very successfully in amateur boxing. Pool left college after one year when he was inducted into military service in the summer of 1941.

World War II service

Pool was drafted into the United States Army on June 14, 1941, from Fort Sam Houston in his native Texas and assigned to the new 3rd Armored Division. Pool married Evelyn Wright while on leave in December 1942. While undergoing training at the Desert Training Center and Indiantown Gap, Pennsylvania, Pool was noted as a very aggressive sergeant, always wanting the best from his men; he even refused a commission as an officer so he could remain close to the front. Pool was promoted to staff sergeant and deployed overseas with the 3rd Armored Division in September 1943.

Pool served with the 3rd Platoon of Company I, 32nd Armored Regiment, 3rd Armored Division, in France between June and September 1944. He successively commanded three Sherman tanks; an M4A1, and two M4A1(76)Ws, all of which bore the nickname "IN THE MOOD" (they were not suffixed with a letter or Roman numeral). He kept the same crew throughout the majority of the war. Corporal Wilbert "Red" Richards was the driver, Private First Class Bertrand "School Boy" Close the assistant driver and bow gunner, Corporal Willis "Ground Hog" Oller the gunner, and Technician Fifth Grade Delbert "Jailbird" Boggs the loader.

Pool's first tank, an M4A1, lasted from June 23 until June 29, when Combat Command A (CCA) attacked for the first time at Villiers-Fossard. It was hit by a Panzerfaust, forcing Pool and his crew to bail out of the stricken tank. His second tank, his first M4A1(76)W, lasted from around July 1 to August 17, when he was leading CCA in clearing remaining German forces from the village of Fromental. This tank was knocked out by friendly fire from a Lockheed P-38 Lightning. His third and last tank, another M4A1(76)W, was destroyed on the night of September 19, 1944, while CCA was attempting to penetrate the Siegfried Line at Münsterbusch, southeast of Aachen, Germany. The tank was hit by an ambushing Panther, and while Pool's driver was trying to back his damaged Sherman up, the Panther hit it a second time. Positioned precariously on the edge of a ditch, the tank was tipped over by the second round. The round killed Pool's replacement gunner, Private First Class Paul Kenneth King, (Corporal Oller had been temporarily transferred back to the United States) and threw Pool out of the commander's hatch, severely injuring him in the leg with shrapnel. As a result, Pool would not return to amateur boxing after the war.

Honors and awards

Later life and death

After 22 months of rehabilitation and being fitted with a prosthesis, Pool opened a filling station and garage at his home in Sinton, Texas, followed by several other businesses, before he re-enlisted in the Army and went into the Transportation Corps. With the intervention of General Roderick R. Allen, he finally managed to "come home" to the 3rd Armored Division in 1948, where he became an instructor in automotive mechanics.

He retired from the U.S. Army on September 19, 1960, with the rank of Chief Warrant Officer Two at Fort Sam Houston, Texas. Afterwards he went to business college, followed by a job as a preacher for $25.00 a week. He also coached Little League Baseball. 

Pool died in his sleep on May 30, 1991, in Killeen, Texas, at the age of 71. He is interred at Fort Sam Houston National Cemetery in San Antonio, Texas. He was survived by his wife Evelyn, four sons and four daughters. 

His son, Captain Jerry Lynn Pool, Sr., was declared missing in action during the Vietnam War in 1970. According to the U.S. Army, on March 24, 1970, Captain Pool was a team leader in the 5th Special Forces Group, and was being extracted by Bell UH-1 Iroquois helicopter from 14 miles inside Ratanakiri province in Cambodia. As the helicopter began its ascent, it was hit by enemy fire, exploded, and crashed, killing Pool and six other soldiers instantly. Pool's remains were recovered on April 12, 1995, and identified on June 20, 2001. He is buried in Arlington National Cemetery.

See also

 Sydney Valpy Radley-Walters – tanker ace of aces for the World War II Western Front Allies
 Tank ace

References

External links
 Enlistment records of Lafayette G. Pool

1919 births
1991 deaths
United States Army personnel of World War II
Recipients of the Legion of Honour
People from Killeen, Texas
People from Sinton, Texas
United States Army non-commissioned officers
Recipients of the Silver Star
Recipients of the Distinguished Service Cross (United States)
Recipients of the Legion of Merit
American amputees
American twins